To date, interplanetary spacecraft have provided abundant evidence of water on Mars, dating back to the Mariner 9 mission, which arrived at Mars in 1971. This article provides a mission by mission breakdown of the discoveries they have made. For a more comprehensive description of evidence for water on Mars today, and the history of water on that planet, see Water on Mars.

Mariner 9 
The findings from the Mariner 9 missions underpinned the later Viking program. The enormous Valles Marineris canyon system is named after Mariner 9 in honor of its achievements.

Viking program

By discovering many geological forms that are typically formed from large amounts of water, Viking orbiters caused a revolution in our ideas about water on Mars. Huge river valleys were found in many areas. They showed that floods of water broke through dams, carved deep valleys, eroded grooves into bedrock, and traveled thousands of kilometers.  Large areas in the southern hemisphere contained branched valley networks, suggesting that rain once fell. The flanks of some volcanoes are believed to have been exposed to rainfall because they resemble those occurring on Hawaiian volcanoes. Many craters look as if the impactor fell into mud. When they were formed, ice in the soil may have melted, turned the ground into mud, then the mud flowed across the surface.  Normally, material from an impact goes up, then down. It does not flow across the surface, going around obstacles, as it does on some Martian craters.  Regions, called "chaotic terrain", seemed to have quickly lost great volumes of water which caused large channels to form downstream. The amount of water involved was almost unthinkable—estimates for some channel flows run to ten thousand times the flow of the Mississippi River. Underground volcanism may have melted frozen ice; the water then flowed away and the ground just collapsed to leave chaotic terrain.

The images below, some of the best from the Viking Orbiters, are mosaics of many small, high resolution images. Click on the images for more detail. Some of the pictures are labeled with place names.

Results from Viking lander experiments strongly suggest the presence of water in the present and in the past of Mars. All samples heated in the gas chromatograph-mass spectrometer (GSMS) gave off water. However, the way the samples were handled prohibited an exact measurement of the amount of water. But, it was around 1%.  General chemical analysis suggested the surface had been exposed to water in the past. Some chemicals in the soil contained sulfur and chlorine that were like those remaining after sea water evaporates. Sulfur was more concentrated in the crust on top of the soil, than in the bulk soil beneath. So it was concluded that the upper crust was cemented together with sulfates that were transported to the surface dissolved in water. This process is common on Earth's deserts. The sulfur may be present as sulfates of sodium, magnesium, calcium, or iron. A sulfide of iron is also possible. Using results from the chemical measurements, mineral models suggest that the soil could be a mixture of about 90% iron-rich clay, about 10% magnesium sulfate (kieserite?), about 5% carbonate (calcite), and about 5% iron oxides (hematite, magnetite, goethite?). These minerals are typical weathering products of mafic igneous rocks. The presence of clay, magnesium sulfate, kieserite, calcite, hematite, and goethite strongly suggest that water was once in the area.  Sulfate contains chemically bound water, hence its presence suggests water was around in the past. Viking 2 found similar group of minerals. Because Viking 2 was much farther north, pictures it took in the winter showed frost.

Mars Global Surveyor 

The Mars Global Surveyor's Thermal Emission Spectrometer (TES) is an instrument able to detect mineral composition on Mars. Mineral composition gives information on the presence or absence of water in ancient times. TES identified a large (30,000 square-kilometer) area (in the Nili Fossae formation) that contained the mineral olivine. It is thought that the ancient impact that created the Isidis basin resulted in faults that exposed the olivine. Olivine is present in many mafic volcanic rocks; in the presence of water it weathers into minerals such as goethite, chlorite, smectite, maghemite, and hematite. The discovery of olivine is strong evidence that parts of Mars have been extremely dry for a long time. Olivine was also discovered in many other small outcrops within 60 degrees north and south of the equator.  Olivine has been found in the SNC (shergottite, nakhlite, and chassigny) meteorites that are generally accepted to have come from Mars.  Later studies have found that olivine-rich rocks cover more than 113,000 square kilometers of the Martian surface. That is 11 times larger than the five volcanoes on the Big Island of Hawaii.

On December 6, 2006 NASA released photos of two craters called Terra Sirenum and Centauri Montes which appear to show the presence of liquid water on Mars at some point between 1999 and 2001.

Hundreds of gullies have been discovered that were formed from liquid water, possible in recent times. These gullies occur on steep slopes and mostly in certain bands of latitude.

Below are some examples of gullies that were photographed by Mars Global Surveyor.

A few channels on Mars displayed inner channels that suggest sustained fluid flows. The best-known is the one in Nanedi Valles. Another was found in Nirgal Vallis.

Many places on Mars show dark streaks on steep slopes, such as crater walls. Dark slope streaks have been studied since the Mariner and Viking missions.  It seems that streaks start out being dark, then they become lighter with age. Often they originate with a small narrow spot, then widen and extend downhill for hundreds of meters. Streaks do not seem to be associated with any particular layer of material because they do not always start at a common level along a slope. Although many of the streaks appear very dark, they are only 10% or less darker than the surrounding surface. Mars Global Surveyor found that new streaks have formed in less than one year on Mars.

Several ideas have been advanced to explain the streaks. Some involve water, or even the growth of organisms.  The generally accepted explanation for the streaks is that they are formed from the avalanching of a thin layer of bright dust that is covering a darker surface. Bright dust settles on all Martian surfaces after a period of time.

Dark streaks can be seen in the images below, as seen from Mars Global Surveyor.

Some parts of Mars show inverted relief. This occurs when materials are deposited on the floor of a stream then become resistant to erosion, perhaps by cementation. Later the area may be buried. Eventually erosion removes the covering layer. The former streams become visible since they are resistant to erosion. Mars Global Surveyor found several examples of this process.  Many inverted streams have been discovered in various regions of mars, especially in the Medusae Fossae Formation, Miyamoto Crater, and the Juventae Plateau.

The image below shows one example.

Mars Pathfinder 

Pathfinder found temperatures varied on a diurnal cycle. It was coldest just before sunrise (about −78 Celsius) and warmest just after Mars noon (about −8 Celsius). These extremes occurred near the ground which both warmed up and cooled down fastest. At this location, the highest temperature never reached the freezing point of water (0 °C), so Mars Pathfinder confirmed that where it landed it is too cold for liquid water to exist. However, water could exist as a liquid if it were mixed with various salts.

Surface pressures varied diurnally over a 0.2 millibar range, but showed 2 daily minima and two daily maxima. The average daily pressure decreased from about 6.75 millibars to a low of just under 6.7 millibars, corresponding to when the maximum amount of carbon dioxide had condensed on the south pole. The pressure on the Earth is generally close to 1000 millibars, so the pressure on Mars is very low. The pressures measured by Pathfinder would not permit water or ice to exist on the surface. But, if ice were insulated with a layer of soil, it could last a long time.

Other observations were consistent with water being present in the past. Some of the rocks at the Mars Pathfinder site leaned against each other in a manner geologists term imbricated. It is believed strong flood waters in the past pushed the rocks around until they faced away from the flow. Some pebbles were rounded, perhaps from being tumbled in a stream. Parts of the ground are crusty, maybe due to cementing by a fluid containing minerals.

There was evidence of clouds and maybe fog.

Mars Odyssey 

In July 2003, at a conference in California, it was announced that the Gamma Ray Spectrometer (GRS) on board the Mars Odyssey had discovered huge amounts of water over vast areas of Mars. Mars has enough ice just beneath the surface to fill Lake Michigan twice.  In both hemispheres, from 55 degrees latitude to the poles, Mars has a high density of ice just under the surface; one kilogram of soil contains about 500 g of water ice. But, close to the equator, there is only 2 to 10% of water in the soil.  Scientists believe that much of this water is locked up in the chemical structure of minerals, such as clay and sulfates. Previous studies with infrared spectroscopes have provided evidence of small amounts of chemically or physically bound water.  The Viking landers detected low levels of chemically bound water in the Martian soil.  It is believed that although the upper surface only contains a percent or so of water, ice may lie just a few feet deeper. Some areas, Arabia Terra, Amazonis quadrangle, and Elysium quadrangle contain large amounts of water.  Analysis of the data suggest that the southern hemisphere may have a layered structure. Both of the poles showed buried ice, but the north pole had none close to it because it was covered over by seasonal carbon dioxide (dry ice). When the measurements were gathered, it was winter at the north pole so carbon dioxide had frozen on top of the water ice.  There may be much more water further below the surface; the instruments aboard the Mars Odyssey are only able to study the top meter or so of soil. If all holes in the soil were filled by water, this would correspond to a global layer of water 0.5 to 1.5 km deep.

The Phoenix lander confirmed the initial findings of the Mars Odyssey.  It found ice a few inches below the surface and the ice is at least 8 inches deep. When the ice is exposed to the Martian atmosphere it slowly sublimates. In fact, some of the ice was exposed by the landing rockets of the craft.

Thousands of images returned from Odyssey support the idea that Mars once had great amounts of water flowing across its surface. Some pictures show patterns of branching valleys. Others show layers that may have formed under lakes. Deltas have been identified.

For many years researchers believed that glaciers existed under a layer of insulating rocks. Lineated deposits are one example of these probable rock-covered glaciers. They are found on the floors of some channels. Their surfaces have ridged and grooved materials that deflect around obstacles. Some glaciers on the Earth show such features. Lineated floor deposits may be related to lobate debris aprons, which have been proven to contain large amounts of ice by orbiting radar.

The pictures below, taken with the THEMIS instrument on board the Mars Odyssey, show examples of features that are associated with water present in the present or past.

Much of the surface of Mars is covered by a thick smooth mantle that is thought to be a mixture of ice and dust.  This ice-rich mantle, a few yards thick, smooths the land, but in places it displays a bumpy texture, resembling the surface of a basketball. The low density of craters on the mantle means it is relatively young.

Changes in Mars's orbit and tilt cause significant changes in the distribution of water ice. During certain climate periods water vapor leaves polar ice and enters the atmosphere. The water returns to the ground at lower latitudes as deposits of frost or snow mixed generously with dust. The atmosphere of Mars contains a great deal of fine dust particles. Water vapor condenses on the particles, then they fall down to the ground due to the additional weight of the water coating. When ice at the top of the mantling layer returns to the atmosphere, it leaves behind dust, which insulates the remaining ice.

Dao Vallis begins near a large volcano, called Hadriaca Patera, so it is thought to have received water when hot magma melted huge amounts of ice in the frozen ground. The partially circular depressions on the left side of the channel in the image above suggests that groundwater sapping also contributed water.

In some areas large river valleys begin with a landscape feature called "chaos" or chaotic terrain."  It is thought that the ground collapsed, as huge amounts of water were suddenly released. Examples of chaotic terrain, as imaged by THEMIS, are shown below.

Phoenix 

The Phoenix lander confirmed the existence of large amounts of water ice in the northern regions of Mars.  This finding was predicted by theory.
and was measured from orbit by the Mars Odyssey instruments.
On June 19, 2008, NASA announced that dice-sized clumps of bright material in the "Dodo-Goldilocks" trench, dug by the robotic arm, had vaporized over the course of four days, strongly implying that the bright clumps were composed of water ice which sublimated following exposure. Even though dry ice also sublimates under the conditions present, it would do so at a rate much faster than observed.

On July 31, 2008, NASA announced that Phoenix confirmed the presence of water ice on Mars. During the initial heating cycle of a new sample, the Thermal and Evolved-Gas Analyzer's (TEGA) mass spectrometer detected water vapor when the sample temperature reached 0 °C.
Liquid water cannot exist on the surface of Mars with its present low atmospheric pressure, except at the lowest elevations for short periods.

Results published in the journal Science after the mission ended reported that chloride, bicarbonate, magnesium, sodium potassium, calcium, and possibly sulfate were detected in the samples. Perchlorate (ClO4), a strong oxidizer, was confirmed to be in the soil. The chemical when mixed with water can greatly lower freezing points, in a manner similar to how salt is applied to roads to melt ice. Perchlorate may be allowing small amounts of liquid water to form on Mars today. Gullies, which are common in certain areas of Mars, may have formed from perchlorate melting ice and causing water to erode soil on steep slopes.

Additionally, during 2008 and early 2009, a debate emerged within NASA over the presence of 'blobs' which appeared on photos of the vehicle's landing struts, which have been variously described as being either water droplets or 'clumps of frost'.  Due to the lack of consensus within the Phoenix science project, the issue had not been raised in any NASA news conferences.  One scientist's view poised that the lander's thrusters splashed a pocket of brine from just below the Martian surface onto the landing strut during the vehicle's landing. The salts would then have absorbed water vapor from the air, which would have explained how they appeared to grow in size during the first 44 Martian days before slowly evaporating as Mars temperature dropped.  Some images even suggest that some of the droplets darkened, then moved and merged; this is strong physical evidence that they were liquid.

For about as far as the camera can see, the land is flat, but shaped into polygons between 2–3 meters in diameter and are bounded by troughs that are 20 cm to 50 cm deep. These shapes are due to ice in the soil expanding and contracting due to major temperature changes.

The microscope showed that the soil on top of the polygons is composed of flat particles (probably a type of clay) and rounded particles. Clay is a mineral that forms from other minerals when water is available. So, finding clay proves the existence of past water. Ice is present a few inches below the surface in the middle of the polygons, and along its edges, the ice is at least 8 inches deep. When the ice is exposed to the Martian atmosphere it slowly sublimates.

Snow was observed to fall from cirrus clouds. The clouds formed at a level in the atmosphere that was around −65 °C, so the clouds would have to be composed of water-ice, rather than carbon dioxide-ice (dry ice) because the temperature for forming carbon dioxide ice is much lower—less than −120 °C. As a result of mission observations, it is now believed that water ice (snow) would have accumulated later in the year at this location.  The highest temperature measured during the mission was −19.6 °C, while the coldest was −97.7 °C. So, in this region the temperature remained far below the freezing point (0°) of water. Bear in mind that the mission took place in the heat of the Martian summer.

Interpretation of the data transmitted from the craft was published in the journal Science. As per the peer reviewed data the site had a wetter and warmer climate in the recent past. Finding calcium carbonate in the Martian soil leads scientists to believe that the site had been wet or damp in the geological past. During seasonal or longer period diurnal cycles water may have been present as thin films. The tilt or obliquity of Mars changes far more than the Earth; hence times of higher humidity are probable. The data also confirms the presence of the chemical perchlorate. Perchlorate makes up a few tenths of a percent of the soil samples. Perchlorate is used as food by some bacteria on Earth. Another paper claims that the previously detected snow could lead to a buildup of water ice.

Mars Exploration Rovers
The Mars Rovers Spirit and Opportunity found a great deal of evidence for past water on Mars. Designed to last only three months, both were still operating after more than six years. Spirit got trapped in a sand pit in 2006, with NASA officially cutting with the rover in 2011. Opportunity lost contact with NASA on June 10 2018 and its mission was declared complete on February 13 2019.

Spirit landed in what was thought to be a huge lake bed. However, the lake bed had been covered over with lava flows, so evidence of past water was initially hard to detect. As the mission progressed and the Rover continued to move along the surface more and more clues to past water were found.

On March 5, 2004, NASA announced that Spirit had found hints of water history on Mars in a rock dubbed "Humphrey". Raymond Arvidson, the McDonnell University Professor and chair of Earth and planetary sciences at Washington University in St. Louis, reported during a NASA press conference: "If we found this rock on Earth, we would say it is a volcanic rock that had a little fluid moving through it." In contrast to the rocks found by the twin rover Opportunity, this one was formed from magma and then acquired bright material in small crevices, which look like crystallized minerals. If this interpretation holds true, the minerals were most likely dissolved in water, which was either carried inside the rock or interacted with it at a later stage, after it formed.

By Sol 390 (Mid-February 2005), as Spirit was advancing towards "Larry's Lookout", by driving up the hill in reverse, it investigated some targets along the way, including the soil target, "Paso Robles", which contained the highest amount of salt found on the red planet. The soil also contained a high amount of phosphorus in its composition, however not nearly as high as another rock sampled by Spirit, "Wishstone". Squyres said of the discovery, "We're still trying to work out what this means, but clearly, with this much salt around, water had a hand here".

As Spirit traveled with a dead wheel in December 2007, pulling the dead wheel behind, the wheel scraped off the upper layer of the Martian soil, uncovering a patch of ground that scientists say shows evidence of a past environment that would have been perfect for microbial life. It is similar to areas on Earth where water or steam from hot springs came into contact with volcanic rocks. On Earth, these are locations that tend to teem with bacteria, said rover chief scientist Steve Squyres. "We're really excited about this," he told a meeting of the American Geophysical Union (AGU). The area is extremely rich in silica – the main ingredient of window glass. The researchers have now concluded that the bright material must have been produced in one of two ways. One: hot-spring deposits produced when water dissolved silica at one location and then carried it to another (i.e. a geyser). Two: acidic steam rising through cracks in rocks stripped them of their mineral components, leaving silica behind. "The important thing is that whether it is one hypothesis or the other, the implications for the former habitability of Mars are pretty much the same," Squyres explained to BBC News. Hot water provides an environment in which microbes can thrive and the precipitation of that silica entombs and preserves them. Squyres added, "You can go to hot springs and you can go to fumaroles and at either place on Earth it is teeming with life – microbial life.

Opportunity was directed to a site that had displayed large amounts of hematite from orbit. Hematite often forms from water. When Opportunity landed, layered rocks and marble-like hematite concretions ("blueberries") were easily visible. In its years of continuous operation, Opportunity sent back much evidence that a wide area on Mars was soaked in liquid water.

During a press conference in March 2006, mission scientists discussed their conclusions about the bedrock, and the evidence for the presence of liquid water during their formation. They presented the following reasoning to explain the small, elongated voids in the rock visible on the surface and after grinding into it (see last two images below).  These voids are consistent with features known to geologists as "vugs". These are formed when crystals form inside a rock matrix and are later removed through erosive processes, leaving behind voids. Some of the features in this picture are "disk-like", which is consistent with certain types of crystals, notably sulfate minerals. Additionally, mission members presented first data from the Mössbauer spectrometer taken at the bedrock site. The iron spectrum obtained from the rock El Capitan shows strong evidence for the mineral jarosite. This mineral contains hydroxide ions, which indicates the presence of water when the minerals were formed. Mini-TES data from the same rock showed that it consists of a considerable amount of sulfates. Sulfates also contain water.

Mars Reconnaissance Orbiter 

The Mars Reconnaissance Orbiter's HiRISE instrument has taken many images that strongly suggest that Mars has had a rich history of water-related processes. A major discovery was finding evidence of hot springs. These may have contained life and may now contain well-preserved fossils of life.

Research, in the January 2010 issue of Icarus, described strong evidence for sustained precipitation in the area around Valles Marineris. The types of minerals there are associated with water. Also, the high density of small branching channels indicates a great deal of precipitation because they are similar to stream channels on the Earth.

Some places on Mars show inverted relief. In these locations, a stream bed appears as a raised feature, instead of a depression. The inverted former stream channels may be caused by the deposition of large rocks or due to cementation of loose materials. In either case erosion would erode the surrounding land and consequently leave the old channel as a raised ridge because the ridge will be more resistant to erosion. Images below, taken with HiRISE show sinuous ridges that are old channels that have become inverted.

In an article published in January 2010, a large group of scientists endorsed the idea of searching for life in Miyamoto Crater because of inverted stream channels and minerals that indicated the past presence of water.

Using data from Mars Global Surveyor, Mars Odyssey and the Mars Reconnaissance Orbiter, scientists have found widespread deposits of chloride minerals. Usually chlorides are the last minerals to come out of solution. A picture below shows some deposits within the Phaethontis quadrangle. Evidence suggests that the deposits were formed from the evaporation of mineral-enriched waters. Lakes may have been scattered over large areas of the Martian surface. Carbonates, sulfates, and silica should precipitate out ahead of them. Sulfates and silica have been discovered by the Mars Rovers. Places with chloride minerals may have once held various life forms. Furthermore, such areas should preserve traces of ancient life.

Rocks on Mars have been found to frequently occur as layers, called strata, in many different places. Columbus Crater is one of many craters that contain layers. Rock can form layers in a variety of ways. Volcanoes, wind, or water can produce layers.  Many places on Mars show rocks arranged in layers. Scientists are happy about finding layers on Mars since layers may have formed under large bodies of water.
Sometimes the layers display different colors. Light-toned rocks on Mars have been associated with hydrated minerals like sulfates. The Mars rover Opportunity examined such layers close-up with several instruments. Some layers are probably made up of fine particles because they seem to break up into fine dust. In contrast, other layers break up into large boulders so they are probably much harder. Basalt, a volcanic rock, is thought to form layers composed of boulders. Basalt has been identified all over Mars. Instruments on orbiting spacecraft have detected clay (also called phyllosilicates) in some layers.  Scientists are excited about finding hydrated minerals such as sulfates and clays on Mars because they are usually formed in the presence of water.  Places that contain clays and/or other hydrated minerals would be good places to look for evidence of life.

Below are a few of the many examples of layers that have been studied with HiRISE.

Much of the surface of Mars is covered by a thick smooth mantle that is thought to be a mixture of ice and dust.  This ice-rich mantle, a few yards thick, smoothes the land. But in places it displays a bumpy texture, resembling the surface of a basketball. Because there are few craters on this mantle, the mantle is relatively young. The images below, all taken with HiRISE, show a variety of views of this smooth mantle.

Changes in Mars's orbit and tilt cause significant changes in the distribution of water ice from polar regions down to latitudes equivalent to Texas. During certain climate periods water vapor leaves polar ice and enters the atmosphere. The water returns to the ground at lower latitudes as deposits of frost or snow mixed generously with dust. The atmosphere of Mars contains a great deal of fine dust particles.  Water vapor condenses on the particles, then they fall down to the ground due to the additional weight of the water coating. When ice at the top of the mantling layer goes back into the atmosphere, it leaves behind dust, which insulates the remaining ice.

HiRISE has carried out many observations of gullies that are assumed to have been caused by recent flows of liquid water. Many gullies are imaged over and over to see if any changes occur. Some repeat observations of gullies have displayed changes that some scientists argue were caused by liquid water over the period of just a few years.  Others say the flows were merely dry flows.  These were first discovered by the Mars Global Surveyor.

Alternate theories for the creation of surface gullies and channels include wind erosion, liquid carbon dioxide, and liquid methane.

Below are some of the many hundreds of gullies that have been studied with HiRISE.

Of interest from the days of the Viking Orbiters are piles of material surrounding cliffs. These deposits of rock debris are called lobate debris aprons (LDAs). These features have a convex topography and a gentle slope from cliffs or escarpments; this suggests flow away from the steep source cliff. In addition, lobate debris aprons can show surface lineations just as rock glaciers on the Earth. Recently, research with the Shallow Radar on the Mars Reconnaissance Orbiter has provided strong evidence that the LDAs in Hellas Planitia and in mid northern latitudes are glaciers that are covered with a thin layer of rocks. Radar from the Mars Reconnaissance Orbiter gave a strong reflection from the top and base of LDAs, meaning that pure water ice made up the bulk of the formation (between the two reflections). Based on the experiments of the Phoenix lander and the studies of the Mars Odyssey from orbit, frozen water is now known to exist at just under the surface of Mars in the far north and south (high latitudes). The discovery of water ice in LDAs demonstrates that water is found at even lower latitudes. Future colonists on Mars will be able to tap into these ice deposits, instead of having to travel to much higher latitudes. Another major advantage of LDAs over other sources of Martian water is that they can easily detected and mapped from orbit. Lobate debris aprons are shown below from the Phlegra Montes, which are at a latitude of 38.2 degrees north. The Phoenix lander set down at about 68 degrees north latitude, so the discovery of water ice in LDAs greatly expands the range of easily available on Mars.  It is far easier to land a spaceship near the equator of Mars, so the closer water is available to the equator the better it will be for future colonists.

Below are examples of lobate debris aprons that were studied with HiRISE.

Research, reported in the journal Science in September 2009, demonstrated that some new craters on Mars show exposed, pure, water ice. After a time, the ice disappears, evaporating into the atmosphere. The ice is only a few feet deep. The ice was confirmed with the Compact Imaging Spectrometer (CRISM) on board the Mars Reconnaissance Orbiter (MRO). The ice was found in five locations. Three of the locations are in the Cebrenia quadrangle. These locations are 55.57° N, 150.62° E; 43.28° N, 176.9° E; and 45° N, 164.5° E. Two others are in the Diacria quadrangle: 46.7° N, 176.8° E and 46.33° N, 176.9° E.
This discovery proves that future colonists on Mars will be able to obtain water from a wide variety of locations. The ice can be dug up, melted, then taken apart to provide fresh oxygen and hydrogen for rocket fuel. Hydrogen is the powerful fuel used by the Space Shuttle main engines.

Curiosity
In 2012, the NASA's rover Curiosity discovered solid evidence for an ancient streambed that used to flow through the rocks. The rover discovered conglomerates, which are rocks made up of sand and gravel. After studying pictures of these rocks, scientists concluded that shape and size of the pebbles that make up the conglomerates signify that they were eroded by water, perhaps several billion years ago. Satellites used to capture evidence of existing channels, which could indicate running water, but did not prove it. This was the first solid major evidence that support these satellite images.

Curiosity carries a meteorological station called REMS (Rover Environmental Monitoring Station). With data from REMS, scientists could in 2015 prove that there are conditions for presence of liquid water on Mars. According to the conclusions, salts in the ground surface on Mars can absorb water vapor from the environment.
The research was presented in Nature Geoscience with Javier Martín-Torres, Professor of Atmospheric Science at Luleå University of Technology as lead author.

See also

 Seasonal flows on warm Martian slopes
 Evolution of water on Mars and Earth
 Life on Mars (planet)#Liquid water
 Mars#Hydrology
 Atmosphere of Mars#Water vapor
 Geology of Mars#Hydrology
 Mars Express#Scientific discoveries and important events
 Mars Global Surveyor#Discovery of water ice on Mars
 2001 Mars Odyssey#Water on Mars
 Phoenix (spacecraft)#Presence of shallow subsurface water ice
 Extraterrestrial liquid water
 Mars Ocean Hypothesis
 Colonization of Mars
 Climate of Mars
 Water vapor#Extraterrestrial
 Extraterrestrial life
 Scientific information from the Mars Exploration Rover mission
 Lobate debris apron
 Vallis
 Martian Gullies
 Glacier

References

Surface features of Mars
Water on Mars